Herculaneum High School is a public high school in the Dunklin R-V School District in Herculaneum, Missouri.

Overview

Herculaneum High School was founded in 1915, with its first high school graduating class in 1919. The average ACT score is 19.4 with a 16:1 student to teacher ratio. Approximately 60% of graduating students go on to college. The graduation rate is 89%.

Energy
The Doe Run Company has invested more than $500,000 into the installation of solar panels on Herculaneum High, poised to save Dunklin R-V School District more than $27,000 a year in energy costs.

References

High schools in Jefferson County, Missouri
Public high schools in Missouri
Education in Jefferson County, Missouri
1915 establishments in Missouri